West Campus is a neighborhood in central Austin, Texas west of Guadalupe Street (the Drag) and its namesake, the University of Texas at Austin. Due to its proximity to the university, West Campus is heavily populated by college students. The area is known for its colorful residential buildings.

History

In the mid-2000s new zoning changes were enacted in order to increase the number of students in the area. This led to construction of new large apartment and condominium projects. In a five-year period ending in 2009, 2,400 apartment and condominium units were constructed.

University of Texas at Austin 
The biggest changes to West Campus in recent years have come about as a result of the University Neighborhood Overlay (UNO) Plan, a city initiative passed in 2004. The UNO plans were "intended to help create a residential district that is close to the campus, consolidating some of the student housing that is scattered throughout the city, and thereby reducing transient student traffic to campus from outside, and reducing the transient parking requirements around West Campus."

The plan sought to bring University of Texas students closer to campus, and to create a denser, urban environment in order to provide more space for the growing student population.

Due to the proximity of the West Campus area to the university, it is close to University facilities such as the Blanton Museum of Art, the Harry Ransom Center, and the LBJ Library. The Bob Bullock Texas State History Museum, which features an IMAX theater, is also nearby.  Pease Park is on the western border at Lamar Boulevard.

Cityscape

West Campus is a community that is a collection of individual neighborhoods. Chuck Lindell of the Austin American-Statesman said that West Campus is bounded roughly by West 29th Street, Guadalupe Street, North Lamar Boulevard, and Martin Luther King Jr. Boulevard. Areas west of San Gabriel tend to be single-family houses, while the area oriented to students of the University of Texas at Austin are located to the east. Some residents believe that San Gabriel Street is the boundary of West campus. Many houses are bungalows.

The eastern boundary of West Campus is a major commercial area known as "The Drag" or Guadalupe Street, where clothing stores, restaurants, bookstores (including the University COOP), and venues are across the street from the University.

The fraternity and sorority life at UT Austin is centered at West Campus. Many small businesses are located in West Campus.

The Caswell Heights subdivision is in the southwest corner of the West Campus area.

American Campus Communities operates multiple housing properties for students. The Block, The Callaway House, and The Castilian are operated by that company. In 2019 the population of these buildings is below 5,000. In 2018 the former Goodall Wooten dormitory closed, as American Campus, the new owner, plans to redevelop it.

Demographics
West Campus has among the highest population densities in the City of Austin. In 2000 the area had about 10,000 people. Due to the influx of new apartments and condominiums, by 2009, according to Chuck Lindell of the Austin American-Statesman, the area may have had over 17,000 residents. As of 2009 many young professionals, faculty members of the University of Texas at Austin, and retirees live in West Campus.

Housing
West Campus houses a variety of architecture and a wide range of mansions, houses, apartments, and is constantly growing due to the housing needs of 51,000+ college students attending UT Austin.

West Campus area’s architecture is diverse, with 80-year-old buildings often found next door to modern condos and apartments. Craftsman homes, bungalows, historic mansions, duplexes, and apartments old and newly built can all be found in this area.

This neighborhood is marked by the wide range of student organizations and Greek communities that occupy it. West Campus is home to more than 50 Greek organizations, more than 12 co-ops, organized by the Inter-Cooperative Council (ICC) and local cooperative organization College Houses, and many other student organizations.

Between West Campus and the University of Texas campus is "The Drag," home to restaurants and shops.

Crime
As of 2009 the Austin Police Department (APD) places about half of the patrol officers from its central-west division in West Campus. Cmdr. Chris Noble of APD says that this is due to the large population in West Campus and not due to a bad crime rate. The community has a large amount of foot traffic. In 2009 Noble said that the foot traffic increases "nuisance" crimes such as fighting, excess noise, and theft, while it acts as a deterrent to some crimes. Noble said "The notorious crimes, mainly the murders - absolutely nothing about that is the result of the neighborhood. Those people were targeted, and it could've happened anywhere in this city, not just West Campus. Violent crime in that area is almost nonexistent. The biggest issues we have are people getting their cars broken into and their bikes stolen." Noble said "you have a greater chance of getting your head bashed in Northwest Hills than downtown, and even less of a chance in the campus area. It's an absolutely great place to live - if you are willing to put up with the university (crowd)."

In 2009 Chuck Lindell of the Austin American-Statesman wrote "despite being an area with relatively little violence, West Campus has been home to some of Austin's most notorious recent crimes". In August 2005 Jennifer Cave was shot to death. Two months later, William "Trey" Ehrhardt, a fourth-year (senior) University of Texas at Austin student, was shot dead in a robbery at his apartment. In 2008 a man named Adrian Lopez was attacked and held captive in a house. The murders of John Goosey and Stacy Barnett occurred on July 21, 2009.

Education
Austin Independent School District operates public schools.

During its first year, Peace Elementary School (now Austin Peace Academy), an Islamic day school, was briefly located in West Campus.

References

Neighborhoods in Austin, Texas